Choi Deok-moon (born 1970) is a South Korean actor.

Filmography

Television series

Film

Theater

References

External links

 
Choi Deok-moon at Daum 
Choi Deok-moon at Naver Movies 

1970 births
Living people
People from Yeongju
South Korean male television actors
South Korean male film actors
South Korean male stage actors
South Korean male web series actors
South Korean television personalities
20th-century South Korean male actors
21st-century South Korean male actors